Jonah Lwanga also referred to as Metropolitan Jonah Lwanga (18 July 1945 – 5 September 2021) was an Ugandan prelate, who served as Archbishop of Kampala and Exarch of All Uganda in the Uganda Orthodox Church. Since 1997, he was also the Metropolitan of the Metropolis of  Kampala and All Uganda, in Central Africa under the Eastern Orthodox Church of Alexandria,  until his death in September 2021. His see was Kampala, with jurisdiction over all Uganda.

Background and education 
Lwanga was born on 18 July 1945 in the village of Ddegeya in present-day Luweero District ,Uganda to Kezia Babitaka. Lwanga's grandfather, Obadiah Basajjakitalo, was one of the two initial leaders of the Orthodox Church in Uganda along with Ruben Spartas Mukasa.

He completed his general education in Bulemezi and Kyaddondo, Uganda (1952-1964).

From 1964 to 1968 he studied at the Ecclesiastical School of Crete. From 1968 to 1978 he held a degree in Theology and Philosophy from the University of Athens.

Vocation 
From 1979 to 1981 he served as Secretary of the Orthodox Mission in Uganda.

Lwanga was ordained a deacon on 1 May 1981 and a year later, in 1982, he was ordained a priest.

After his ordination, Lwanga was appointed Dean at the Archbishop Makarios III Patriarchal Orthodox Seminary in Riruta, Nairobi, and taught theology. He was subsequently elevated to the status of Archimandrite in 1992. Shortly after, he was ordained the Vicar Bishop of Bukoba, Tanzania on 27 January 1992.

On 12 May 1997, Lwanga was transferred from the Bishopric of Bukoba, Tanzania, to Uganda as Metropolitan of Kampala and All Uganda after the death of Metropolitan Theodoros Nankyama ..

Lwanga was pronounced dead on 5 September 2021 in Athens, Greece. The cause of death was given as prostate cancer in some sources while others mentioned a "long illness".

Inter Religious Council of Uganda 
Alongside Archbishop Livingstone Mpalanyi Nkoyoyo, Sheikh Shaban Mubajje and Cardinal Emmanuel Wamala.Lwanga was a co-founder of the Inter Religious Council of Uganda in 2002. At the time of his death, was a Member, Council of presidents, a position he had held since the time of the body's inception.

See also
 Eastern Orthodoxy in Uganda
 Chrysostomos Papasarantopoulos

Sources

 Article on the Eastern Orthodox Church in Uganda
 Jonah (Lwanga) of Kampala at OrthodoxWiki.
 Holy Archdioceses
 Metropolitan Jonah of Kampala and All Uganda at Orthodox Research Institute. (OCMC Magazine,  Vol. 15, No. 2 (1999)).
 Devil has taken charge of Uganda - Jonah Lwanga

1945 births
2021 deaths
20th-century Eastern Orthodox bishops
21st-century Eastern Orthodox bishops
Eastern Orthodox missionaries
Eastern Orthodox Christians from Uganda
Ugandan clergy
National and Kapodistrian University of Athens alumni
Bishops of the Greek Orthodox Church of Alexandria